Skalka (German: Rommersreuth) is a village in Karlovy Vary Region, Czech Republic. It is one of the six municipality districts of Hazlov. In 2001 the village had a population of 125.

Geography 
Skalka lies 2 km north from Hazlov, about 612 meters above sea level. It is surrounded by forests. It neighbour with Hazlov to the south and with Výhledy to the north. To the west and to the east there is the German border.

History 
Skalka was first mentioned in 1224. Until 1868 was a part of Hazlov, but in 1868 create an own municipality, with Otov (village, which not exist anymore). Skalka was often visited by J. W. Goethe. Goethe researched a flint rocks over the village, which was later named after him. From 1970 is Skalka one of the six municipality districts of Hazlov.

The name of the village 
In Czech, Skalka is diminutive from Skála, which means Rock. The old German name, Rommersreuth is composite for Rommer (Rommer is name) and Reuth, which means Glade or Clearing; Glade of Rommer. Johann Wolfgang Goethe connect the name Rommersreuth with Roman settlement, but that is wrong.

Landmarks 
 World War I memorial from 1925,
 Two iron crucifixs, one from 1856,
 Frame house,
 Goethovy skály (The rocks of Goethe)- flint rocks, natural monument.

Gallery

References 

Hazlov
Villages in Cheb District